Steele is an unincorporated community in Tontitown Township, Washington County, Arkansas, United States. It is located at the intersection of Barrington Road and Arbor Acres Road in Tontitown.

References

Unincorporated communities in Washington County, Arkansas
Unincorporated communities in Arkansas